Neusticurus tatei, also known commonly as Tate's neusticurus, is a species of lizard in the family Gymnophthalmidae. The species is endemic to Venezuela.

Etymology
The specific name, tatei, is in honor of American mammalogist George Henry Hamilton Tate.

Geographic range
N. tatei is found in the state of Bolívar, Venezuela.

Habitat

Reproduction
N. tatei is oviparous.

References

Further reading
Burt CE, Burt MD (1931). "South American Lizards in the Collection of the American Museum of Natural History". Bulletin of the American Museum of Natural History 61: 227–395. (Arthrosaura tatei, new species, pp. 313–315, Figures 1–4).
Uzzell TM (1966). "Teiid Lizards of the Genus Neusticurus (Reptilia, Sauria)". Bull. American Mus. Nat. Hist. 132: 279–327. (Neusticurus tatei, new combination, pp. 283–286).

Neusticurus
Reptiles of Venezuela
Endemic fauna of Venezuela
Reptiles described in 1931
Taxa named by Charles Earle Burt
Taxa named by May Danheim Burt